Lars Ingier (15 February 1760 – 22 June 1828) was a Norwegian military officer, road manager, land owner and mill owner.

Personal life
Ingier was born in Ullensaker as the son of military officer Hans Christophersøn Ingier and Anne Schulstad. The Ingier family hailed from the ancient Ullensaker farm Ingier, known from the Middle Ages as Ingigjærdi. In 1792 he married Gjertrud Maren Juel. He died at Stubljan in Aker in 1828.

Career
Ingier graduated from the Norwegian Military Academy, with the rank of Premier Lieutenant. He then abandoned the military career and started a career in road construction. From the 1780s he was appointed road manager of the Diocese of Akershus, which covered most of Eastern Norway at the time. Among his road projects were the King's road through Krokskogen and a new road passing the mountain at Holmestrand. He is credited for having introduced right-hand driving in Norway, by issuing posters in 1807, and this principle was included in the Road Traffic Regulation Acts of 1824 and 1851.

In 1799 he acquired the farms Stubljan and Hvitebjørn from his wife's aunt Maren Juel, and the family settled at Stubljan. At his estate Ingier was running four saw mills, a corn mill, a niter mill and a powder mill. His wife was related to leading Christiania families, and Stubljan became the site for parties for the city's social elite. While running the activities at his estate, he retained his position as road manager. During the Dano-Swedish War of 1808-1809 he was in command of a pioneer unit in Østfold, responsible for technical support. He was promoted to the rank Lieutenant Colonel in 1809.

Ingier was decorated as a Knight of the Swedish Order of the Sword in 1818. The Ingierstrand seaside resort in Oppegård, originally part of Stubljan and acquired by Oslo Municipality in 1936, is named after the Ingier family.

References

1760 births
1828 deaths
People from Ullensaker
Norwegian Military Academy alumni
Norwegian Army personnel
Norwegian military personnel of the Napoleonic Wars
Norwegian civil servants
Norwegian landowners
Norwegian businesspeople
Knights of the Order of the Sword